Otterstedt is a village in the district of Verden, in Lower Saxony, Germany. It is part of the municipality Ottersberg. 

It is notable for the nearby lake Otterstedter See, which is a local resort. It was formed around  12000 years ago at the retreat of the glacial ice.  It has an area of 4.5 ha, and a maximum depth of 11 m.

Notes

External links 
http://www.otterstedt.de (private blog)

Villages in Lower Saxony